Maria Enriquez de Luna (1474 – 1539) was the wife of Juan (Giovanni) Borgia, second Duke of Gandia. Her father was, Enrique Enríquez de Quiñones, making her paternal grandfather Fadrique Enríquez. Her aunt, Juana Enríquez, was Queen of Aragon by marriage to John II of Aragon.  Therefore, she was a first cousin of King Ferdinand II of Aragon and Queen Isabella of Castile, and therefore of the House of Trastamara. She married Juan somewhere between 1493 and 1494, and together, they had two children: Juan de Borja y Enriquez (known as Juan Borgia), who became the 3rd Duke of Gandía, and Isabel de Borja y Enriquez, who was born shortly before her father was killed and never knew him. The younger Juan was the father of Saint Francis Borgia. Isabel grew up to be abbess of Santa Clara in Gandia. In personality, Maria was very intelligent, devout, financially shrewd, and devoted to her husband and children, in contrast to her husband, who was regarded by many as a womanizer, a gambler, a drunkard, and an incompetent general.

Sometime after the end of Pope Alexander VI's papacy, Maria, along with her aunt Isabella of Castile, tried to press murder charges against her brother-in-law, Cesare Borgia for the alleged murder of her husband Juan.

Bibliography 
 Soler Salcedo, Juan Miguel (2008). Nobleza Española: grandeza inmemorial 1520. Visión Libros. .
 Salazar y Acha, Jaime de (2010). «Una rama subsistente del linade de Borja en la América española». Boletín de la Real Academia Matritense de Heráldica y Genealogía (75):  pp. 16–17. OCLC 27332380.

See also 
 House of Borgia
 Monastery of Sant Jeroni de Cotalba
 Route of the Borgias
 Dukes of Gandía
 Enríquez
 Diario Borja - Borgia  Tres siglos de Historia día a día

Enriquez de Luna, Maria
Maria
Enriquez de Luna, Maria
Enriquez de Luna, Maria
Enriquez de Luna, Maria